Romance Is on the Rise is an album released in July 1974 by Genevieve Waite. It was produced by her then husband, John Phillips. The album was fairly well received and in 1977 it made number No 98 on Paul Gambaccini's list of the Top 200 Albums of All Time.

An electro-dub cover of the song "Biting My Nails", released in 1987 by Renegade Soundwave, became an underground dance hit.

Track listing

Personnel 
Genevieve Waite - lead vocals
David Spinozza, John Tropea - lead guitar
"Dr" Eric Hord, John Phillips - acoustic guitar
Andy Muson, Russell George - bass guitar
Ken Asher - keyboards
Rick Marotta - drums
David Spinozza, John Phillips, Ken Asher - orchestral arrangements
Technical
John Phillips – producer
Richard Avedon – cover photography

References

1974 debut albums